Josep Romeu Argemi (born 22 May 1990) is a Spanish former field hockey player who played as a defender for the Spanish national team.

At the 2016 Summer Olympics, he competed for the national team in the men's tournament. He played club hockey in Belgium for KHC Leuven and Club Egara in Spain.

International career
Josep has been playing for the national team since 2014 when he made his debut in a test match against Great Britain. He was part of the Spain squad that finished thirteenth at the 2018 World Cup. He scored one goal in three games in that tournament. At the 2019 EuroHockey Championship, he won his first medal with the national team as they finished second. On 25 May 2021, he was selected in the squad for the 2021 EuroHockey Championship. After the 2020 Summer Olympics he retired from the national team after having achieved a 152 caps.

References

External links

1990 births
Living people
Spanish male field hockey players
Male field hockey defenders
Field hockey players at the 2016 Summer Olympics
2018 Men's Hockey World Cup players
Field hockey players at the 2020 Summer Olympics
Olympic field hockey players of Spain
Field hockey players from Barcelona
Club Egara players
División de Honor de Hockey Hierba players
Men's Belgian Hockey League players
Expatriate field hockey players
Spanish expatriate sportspeople in Belgium
KHC Leuven players